

Lake Harris is a locality in the Australian state of South Australia located about  north-west of the capital city of Adelaide and which is associated with the lake also known as Lake Harris.

The locality was established on 26 April 2013 in respect to “the long established local name” which is derived from the lake of the same name.  The boundary with the adjoining locality of Wilgena was located with the result that the western branch of Lake Harris and the western half of an island named Wallabin Island were located within the former locality.  In 2014, the boundary was altered to “ensure the whole of Wallabin Island is within the rural locality of Lake Harris.”

The principal land use within the locality is conservation with the full extent of the locality being occupied by the Lake Gairdner National Park.

Lake Harris is located within the federal Division of Grey, the state electoral district of Giles, the Pastoral Unincorporated Area of South Australia and the state's Far North region.

See also
Harris Lake (disambiguation)

References

Towns in South Australia
Far North (South Australia)
Places in the unincorporated areas of South Australia